Maksim Alekseyevich Groshev (born 13 June 1978) is a Russian professional football manager and a former player. He is the manager of FC Orenburg-2.

External links
 

1978 births
Sportspeople from Magdeburg
Living people
Russian footballers
Association football midfielders
Russian football managers
Footballers from Saxony-Anhalt
FC Orenburg players
FC Nosta Novotroitsk players